Jan Kapela (25 April 1931 – 3 May 1987) was a Polish politician, first secretary of the Polish United Workers' Party County Committee in Płońsk, in the years 1975–1978 vice-mayor of Warsaw and ex officio vice-voivode of Warsaw.

Political activity 
In 1948 he joined the Polish Workers' Party (PPR), then he joined the Polish United Workers' Party (PZPR). In 1951 he completed a course for first secretaries at the PZPR County Committee in Pułtusk. In 1973–1975 he was the first secretary of the PZPR County Committee in Płońsk, and then from 1975 to 1978 he was a member of the executive committee of the Warsaw Committee of the Polish United Workers' Party. From 1975 to 1978 he held the position of the vice-mayor of Warsaw and, ex officio, the vice-voivode of Warsaw. Then, from 1978 to 1979, he was a member of the Warsaw Committee of the Polish United Workers' Party.

Death 
He was buried at the Powązki Military Cemetery (B15 / 4/3).

Honours and awards 
In 1955 he was awarded the Silver Cross of Merit.

References 

Burials at Powązki Military Cemetery
Polish United Workers' Party members
Polish Workers' Party politicians
1931 births
1987 deaths